Siah Varud (also Romanized as Sīāh Varūd, Seyāh Varūd, Sīāh Vorūd, and  Sīyāh Varūd; also known as Seyāh Rūd, Sīāhrūd, Sīāveh Rūd, and Siyakh-Rud) is a village in Aliyan Rural District, Sardar-e Jangal District, Fuman County, Gilan Province, Iran. At the 2006 census, its population was 712, in 177 families.

References 

Populated places in Fuman County